The Suat is a right tributary of the river Gădălin in Romania. It flows into the Gădălin in Căianu Mic.

References

Rivers of Romania
Rivers of Cluj County